Ruslan Majidov, also spelled Medzhidov (Azeri: Ruslan Məcidov), (born 22 August 1985) is an Azerbaijani footballer (goalkeeper) who last played for AZAL PFK. He is a former member of the Azerbaijan national football team. Majidov also has Russian citizenship.

Career statistics

Club

International

References

External links
 

1985 births
Living people
Azerbaijani footballers
Azerbaijan international footballers
Azerbaijani expatriate footballers
Widzew Łódź players
Gostaresh Foulad F.C. players
Expatriate footballers in Iran
FC Anzhi Makhachkala players
Expatriate footballers in Azerbaijan
Expatriate footballers in Poland
Azerbaijani expatriate sportspeople in Poland
Sumgayit FK players
Footballers from Baku
FC Kristall Smolensk players
FC Spartak Moscow players
Association football goalkeepers
Neftçi PFK players
FK Genclerbirliyi Sumqayit players